The Supreme Court of Hong Kong was the highest court in Hong Kong prior to the transfer of sovereignty of Hong Kong from the United Kingdom to the People's Republic of China in 1997 and heard cases of first instance and appeals from the District and Magisrates Courts as well as certain tribunals. The Supreme Court was from 1976 made up of the High Court of Justice (High Court) and the Court of Appeal.

On 1 July 1997, the Supreme Court became the High Court which is made up of the Court of First Instance and the Court of Appeal.

History

Establishment
The Supreme Court was established in 1844 after Hong Kong became a British Crown colony under the Treaty of Nanjing.  The first sitting of the court was on 1 October 1844 presided over by the first Chief Justice, John Walter Hulme.

Appeals
For almost 70 years after establishment of the court, there was no Court of Appeal in Hong Kong.   Appeals were either by way or re-hearing or direct to the Judicial Committee of the Privy Council. From 1913, appeals were heard by a Full Court made up of 3 judges. From 1913 to 1943, a judge of the British Supreme Court for China in Shanghai was eligible to sit on the Full Court. In the 1910s and 1920s, a Shanghai judge would regularly travel to Hong Kong to sit on the Full Court.  Sir Havilland de Sausmarez, a judge of the Shanghai court, was the President of the Full Court from 1910 to 1920. From 1926 to 1941, a judge of the Hong Kong Supreme Court also sat on the full court of the British Supreme Court for China.

The Court of Appeal was established in 1976.  Appeals from the Court of Appeal and Full Court and, certain criminal appeals from the High Court, lay to the Judicial Committee of the Privy Council in the United Kingdom.  In order to appeal to the Privy Council, leave to appeal was required either from the court appealed from or the Privy Council.

Renaming on transfer of sovereignty
After the transfer of sovereignty the Supreme Court was renamed as the High Court and the High Court of the former Supreme Court was renamed the Court of First Instance. Appeals from the Court of Appeal (and where there is such a direct appeal, the Court of First Instance) are now heard by the Court of Final Appeal which was established on 1 July 1997.

Buildings
 1844–1848:  A building at the junction of Wyndham and Wellington Streets
 1848–?:  Exchange Building, 7 Queen's Road, Central, a building originally erected for Dent & Co. by Tam Achoy.
 1889–1911:  No. 29 Queen's Road, Central, between the Post Office and Land Office
 1912–1980:  The old Supreme Court Building – until 2012, the Legislative Council Building at 8 Jackson Road, Central, Hong Kong Island.  It became the new seat of the Court of Final Appeal in September 2015.
 1980–1983:  The Former French Mission Building, later home to the Court of Final Appeal (1997–2015)
 1985–1997:  The new Supreme Court Building – now the High Court Building at 38 Queensway, Admiralty, Hong Kong Island

Further reading
A full history of the Supreme Court up to the early 20th Century is in James William Norton-Kyshe's:

 The History of the Laws and Courts of Hong Kong: Tracing Consular Jurisdiction in China and Japan and including Parliamentary Debates: And the Rise, Progress, and Successive Changes in the Various Public Institutions of the Colony from the Earliest Period to the Present

See also
Judiciary of Hong Kong
Chief Justice of the Supreme Court of Hong Kong
 Maurice Heenan
 Sir Ti-Liang Yang
 Sir Denys Roberts
 Sir Noel Power
 Sir George Phillippo
 Sir Havilland de Sausmarez

References

 
Defunct courts
1844 establishments in Hong Kong
Courts and tribunals established in 1844